A. chinensis may refer to:
 Aesculus chinensis, the Chinese horse chestnut, a tree species found in eastern Asia
 Anemone chinensis, one of the 50 fundamental herbs used in traditional Chinese medicine

See also 
 Chinensis (disambiguation)